The 1974 Western Isles Area Council election, the first election to the Western Isles Council, was held on 7 May 1974 as part of the wider 1974 Scottish regional elections. All candidates stood as Independents, and 16 candidates were elected unopposed.

Aggregate results

Ward results

References

1974 Scottish local elections
1974